The Development, Concepts and Doctrine Centre (DCDC) is the United Kingdom (UK) Ministry of Defence’s (MOD's) think tank.

History
The DCDC, originally called the Joint Doctrine and Concepts Centre (JDCC), was established as a result of the 1998 Strategic Defence Review. The UK recognised that it needed to have a clearer long-term vision of the way in which it expected it forces and their methods of operation to develop.

Structure
The DCDC is headed by a two-star officer, located at Shrivenham and is under the UK's Strategic Command but reports to the Vice Chief of the Defence Staff (VCDS) who sets its priorities and outputs.

Outputs
DCDC produces many publications relating to the future global environment. It also has a Doctrine Team responsible for writing and maintaining a range of joint operational level UK and NATO doctrine publications, and Strategy, Analysis and Research and Legal Teams such as the Global Strategic Trends Programme.

Directors
The list of Directors of the JDCC and DCDC have been:

Director JDCC
Major-General Anthony Milton 1999-2002
Air Vice-Marshal Iain McNicoll 2002-2005
Rear Admiral Christopher Parr 2005-2008 (JDCC became DCDC around 2006)

Director DCDC
Major-General Paul Newton 2008-2010
Air Vice-Marshal M. Paul Colley 2010-2012
Major-General Andrew Sharpe 2012-2013
Rear Admiral Paul Bennett 2013-2013
Rear Admiral John Kingwell 2013-2016
Major General Gerald I. Mitchell 2016-2020
Major-General Darrell Amison 2020–2022.
Air Vice-Marshal John Monahan 2022–present

References

External links
Development, Concepts and Doctrine Centre
Development, Concepts and Doctrine Centre  Archived Website

British defence policymaking
Futures studies organizations
Prediction
Ministry of Defence (United Kingdom)
Think tanks based in the United Kingdom
Think tanks established in 1998